Stephen Yan (born in Hong Kong) is a Canadian television host. He hosted the Canadian television cooking show for CBC Television, Wok with Yan.

The Vancouver-based chef moved to Canada in the 1960s and owned two Chinese restaurants in Vancouver. His hit show was originally produced at CBOT in Ottawa from 1980 to 1995, with many episodes shot at the CTV studio in Ottawa (CJOH-TV) and was syndicated in the United States and Asia. Over 15 years, Stephen produced over 500 episodes of Wok with Yan.

Stephen also has produced travel and variety shows called Wok's Up? for CBC, Yan's Wokking for BCTV, and several half-hour travel specials on Thailand, Hong Kong, Japan, Walt Disney World, Malaysia, Singapore, and Fiji.

On May 14, 1986, Yan also released a 60-minute show on video cassette titled, Wok On The Wild Side, Wok With Yan Volume 2, where he showed how to prepare and cook the following menu: prawns in a nest, egg rolls, sweet and sour fish, gold coin beef, hot and sour soup, ginger lobster, and chicken with pineapple.
 
Yan's charismatic personality on his television show can be attributed to his spontaneous humour that included one-liners spoken with his trademark Cantonese accent or him playing with his food or cookware. He has appeared on Late Night with David Letterman, Good Morning America, Live with Regis and Kelly, and other shows from the United States to Australia.

A trademark of his was aprons that bore a different 'wok' pun every show. 

Yan was the author of bestselling cook books:

 Vegetables the Chinese Way 
 Creative Carving
 The Stephen Yan Seafood Wokbook
 Wok with Yan Television Cookbook

He also created various names for some of the ingredients that he used in his cooking, they include:

"Chinese Water"
"Wonder Powder"
"Five Spicey"

Wok Before You Run is another cooking videotape produced in the 1980s and distributed worldwide.

He is not related to Chinese American chef Martin Yan of the PBS series Yan Can Cook, though Martin was an employee and had worked for Stephen Yan in the 1980s as demonstrator for Stephen's products.

External links
Wok with Yan
Stephen Yan

Living people
Canadian restaurateurs
Canadian television chefs
Hong Kong emigrants to Canada
Naturalized citizens of Canada
Year of birth missing (living people)
Canadian male chefs